The Minister of Transport and Local Government in Iceland is the head of the Ministry of Transport and Local Government and forms a part of the Cabinet of Iceland. The ministry was formed in 2017 and the current minister is Sigurður Ingi Jóhannsson.

History 
The Minister of Communications was a cabinet position which existed between 20 November 1959 and 1 October 2009. The Minister of Communications existed alongside the minister after 1 January 1970 when the Cabinet of Iceland Act no. 73/1969 took effect since ministries had not formally existed separately from the ministers. On 1 October 2009 the position became Minister of Transport, Communications and Local Government and the ministry itself was also renamed accordingly. On 31 December 2010 the Ministry of Transport, Communications and Local Government was merged with the Ministry of Justice and Human Rights to form the Ministry of the Interior. On 1 May 2017 the Ministry of the Interior was again split up into the Ministry of Justice and the Ministry of Transport and Local Government.

List of ministers

Minister of Communications (20 November 1959 – 1 October 2009)

Minister of Transport, Communications and Local Government (1 October 2009 – 31 December 2010)

Minister of the Interior (2011–2017) 

 See Minister of the Interior (Iceland)

Minister of Transport and Local Government (2017–2021)

Minister of Infrastructure (2021–)

References 

Communications